"Symptoms of True Love" is a 1988 song by American singer–songwriter Tracie Spencer. This song is the second single released from  Spencer's self-titled debut album. The single was released on February 17, 1988. The song was written by German composer team Irmgard Klarmann and Felix Weber.

Background
Unlike her first single from the album (the ballad "Hide and Seek"), this song is an uptempo club/dance track. The theme of the song focuses on Spencer discovering that she is suffering from "symptoms of true love" and lists the causes.

Chart information
"Symptoms of True Love" was Spencer's first single to chart on the Billboard Hot 100, reaching number 38. On the Hot Black Singles chart, it peaked at a respectable number 11.

Music video
The music video for "Symptoms of True Love" is rather simple and it was made in March 1988, and it shows Spencer and a group of friends dancing and grooving along to the song. The video's set features comic book-style art in the vein of Roy Lichtenstein.

Charts

Weekly charts

References

1988 singles
Tracie Spencer songs
Songs written by Felix Weber (songwriter)
1987 songs
Capitol Records singles
Freestyle music songs